Fatty Finn is a 1980 Australian film, directed by Maurice Murphy and starring Ben Oxenbould with Rebecca Rigg. It is based on the 1930s cartoon-strip character, Fatty Finn, created by Syd Nicholls and is loosely based on the 1927 silent film, The Kid Stakes.

Plot
Set in inner-city Woolloomooloo in Sydney, New South Wales in 1930, the neighbourhood nice guys are led by Fatty (real name Hubert Finn), an ambitious 10-year-old with an eye for making a quid. From shady frog jumping contests to a fixed goat race, Fatty uses his enterprise to raise enough money to buy a crystal set (radio without a separate power supply) that's worth seventeen shillings & sixpence (17/6), more than his Dad is able to save up in a year. Bruiser Murphy the bully and his gang try to stop him. Fatty uses his brains against his enemies' brawn to eventually triumph.

Cast
 Ben Oxenbould as Hubert 'Fatty' Finn
 Rebecca Rigg as Tilly
 Jeremy Larsson as Headlights
 Martin Lewis as Skeet
 Hugo Grieve as Seasy
 Sandy Leask as Lolly Legs
 Greg Kelly as Bruiser Murphy
 Christopher Norton as Snootle
 Bert Newton as John Finn
 Noni Hazlehurst as Myrtle Finn
 Gerard Kennedy as Tiger Murphy
 Su Cruickshank as Mrs Murphy
 Lorraine Bayly as Maggie McGrath
 Bill Young as Officer Claffey
 Ross Higgins as Radio Announcer
 Peter Rowley as Chauffeur

Production
Screenwriter Bob Ellis says it was his idea to make the film. He complained about interference from the film's producers, John Sexton and Yoram Gross, claiming Sexton in particular wanted a lot of changes, but changed his mind after David Puttnam praised Ellis' original draft. He later said of the film that "all the performances are dreadful, the conspicuous exception being Bert Newton's."

Of the $350,000 budget, $120,000 came from the AFC.

The movie was set in Woolloomooloo but the area had changed a lot since then so was shot in and around Glebe. Filming took place in January and February 1980.

Reception

Box office
Fatty Finn grossed $1,064,000 at the box office in Australia, which is equivalent to $3,777,200
in 2009 dollars.

Awards
The film was nominated for seven Australian Film Institute Awards in 1981 winning in the categories of 'Best Achievement in Costume Design' and 'Best Original Music Score'.

See also
 Cinema of Australia

References

External links

Fatty Finn at Oz Movies

Fatty Finn at the National Film and Sound Archive
Fatty Finn at Peter Malone

1980 films
Australian fantasy comedy films
1980s fantasy comedy films
Films based on Australian comics
Films set in the 1930s
Live-action films based on comics
Films set in Sydney
1980s English-language films
Films directed by Maurice Murphy